A-967079 is a drug which acts as a potent and selective antagonist for the TRPA1 receptor. It has analgesic and antiinflammatory effects and is used in scientific research, but has not been developed for medical use.

References 

Fluoroarenes